"March of the Khmer Republic"  was the national anthem of the Khmer Republic from 1970 to 1975. The song is often attributed to groups of students, led by Hang Thun Hak, at the Royal University of Fine Arts in Phnom Penh, but academic sources say it was written and composed by the Buddhist monk activist Khieu Chum, a student of Hem Chieu. The song was adopted as the national anthem of the newly founded Khmer Republic on 9 October 1970 after the overthrow of the monarchy. After the end of the Republic due to the Khmer Rouge victory in 1975, the song ceased to be the national anthem and was officially replaced in 1976 by the Khmer Rouge anthem "Victorious Seventeenth of April".

The "enemy" in the first line of the second stanza is a reference to the invasion of Cambodia by the North Vietnamese communists that began on 29 March 1970, just eighteen days after the coup, at the request of the Khmer Rouge's second in command, Nuon Chea, and had completely overrun the northeast of Cambodia by the time the Republic was declared that October.

Lyrics

References

External links
 MIDI file

1970 songs
Historical national anthems
Cambodian songs